The Korea Racing Authority Equine Museum is a horse museum in Gwacheon, South Korea. Established on September 13, 1988, to complement Equestrian at the 1988 Summer Olympics in Seoul, it has over 50,000 visitors annually in a variety of audiences, ranging from the elderly to children. It has roughly 1,500 exhibits in 123 square meters of showroom space. In 2008, a special exhibition was held running over 100 years of horse racing, and in 2009 hosted modern artwork, including painting, sculpture, ceramics and photographs related to horses.

See also
List of museums in South Korea

References

External links
Official site

Museums in Seoul
Horse racing museums and halls of fame
Museums established in 1988
1988 Summer Olympics
Horse racing in South Korea